Muzhinovo is a rural locality (a selo) and the administrative center of Muzhinovskoye Rural Settlement, Kletnyansky District, Bryansk Oblast, Russia. The population was 393 as of 2010. There are 4 streets.

Geography 
Muzhinovo is located 17 km south of Kletnya (the district's administrative centre) by road. Olshanka is the nearest rural locality.

References 

Rural localities in Kletnyansky District